was a village located in Iwate District, Iwate Prefecture, Japan.

History
Tamayama was created as an administrative entity on April 1, 1889, within Minami-Iwate District with the establishment of the municipality system. The new administrative entity merged three pre-existing villages: Tamayama, Hinoto, and Kawamata. Minami-Iwate merged with Kita-Iwate District to form Iwate District on March 29, 1896. Tamayama merged with the neighboring villages of Shibutami and Yabukawa on April 1, 1954, and with Makihori on June 1, 1955. On January 10, 2006, Tamayama was merged into the expanded city of Morioka and no longer exists as an independent municipality.

As of January 2006, the village had an estimated population of 13,530 and a population density of 34.05 persons per km2. The total area was 397.32 km2.

References

External links
 Official website of Morioka 

Dissolved municipalities of Iwate Prefecture
Morioka, Iwate